Buck Smith (born July 22, 1965) is an American professional boxer in the welterweight division. Although Smith has never been considered more than a journeyman fighter, he is one of boxing's all-time knockout kings with 120 KO's.

Professional career

Smith turned professional in 1987 without having ever boxed before. He lost his very first pro fight, when he volunteered from an Oklahoma City audience for a no-show. He fought someone named Ali Smith and received $50 for his troubles. He had 15 minutes to prepare and competed in street shorts and basketball shoes. Despite losing, Buck Smith managed to last the distance and from then on was obsessed with becoming a fighter. After the loss, Smith embarked on a long winning streak, fighting just about every week, albeit against very ordinary opposition in small Midwestern club venues. When questioned on the level of competition he was facing, Smith calmly responded: "I'm not fighting one bum a month, I'm fighting three or four." He would usually drive himself to fights in his red Honda Civic, with his manager (and lone cornerman) riding shotgun. Smith admitted that he used his heavy schedule to his advantage: his theory was that it was better to get paid to fight and beat lesser opponents than to spar against better ones for little or no money.

All in all, Smith is officially credited with having boxed 224 professional boxing matches. Of these he won 179, 120 of them by knockout. He lost 19 and boxed to 2 draws. However, it is possible that Smith had fought even more matches under different names, so it is impossible to truly say how many fights he really had.

Despite his long record, Buck Smith never won any major boxing titles. But while most of wins came against unknown opposition, he did manage a few good results. This included a 7th-round KO over contender and European champion Kirkland Laing (who once beat the legendary Roberto Durán) and a second-round knockout over 1988 Olympic gold medalist Robert Wangila. The win over Wangila got him featured in Ring Magazine, the most prominent of all boxing publications. At the time, Smith sported an official record of 96-2-1 with 70 wins by KO and was ranked 13th at welterweight by the WBC.

He also lost to several former and future champions that included Buddy McGirt, Mark Breland, Julio César Chávez and Antonio Margarito.

It is also notable that Buck Smith once fought twice in one day. On May 19, 1992 he fought Marco Davis in Kansas City and won by KO in two rounds. Less than 3 hours later, he was back in Oklahoma City and won a six-round decision over Rodney Johnson. A similar "iron man stint" by Buck Smith occurred in the month of March in 1993 when Buck Smith fought a total of 12 professional boxing matches. He won all 12, 9 of them by knockout.  Such procedures are illegal after the Boxing Reform Act of 1996.  By rule, states must honor suspensions, which include a minimum of seven days between bouts.

Smith last fought on June 30, 2007. Fighting far above his best weight, he lost to Marcus Oliveira by second-round KO in a cruiserweight contest. 
His last win came in a bout with Manuel Esparza against whom he won a 4-round decision in December 1997. That means he did not win a single fight in his last twelve years as a professional boxer. His record stands at 179 wins, 20 losses, 2 draws, and 25 no contests in 226 fights.

Fight fixing allegations
Smith is perhaps best known for his role in the government's attempted crackdown on fight fixing in 2004–2005. Smith, along with colleagues Verdell Smith and Sean Gibbons, were called upon to give testimony. The crew were nicknamed the Knucklehead Boxing Club, and traveled throughout the Midwest making frequent appearances on fight cards.

Professional boxing record

|-
|align="center" colspan=8|179 Wins (120 knockouts, 59 decisions), 20 Losses (9 knockouts, 11 decisions), 2 Draws, 25 No Contests 
|-
| align="center" style="border-style: none none solid solid; background: #e3e3e3"|Result
| align="center" style="border-style: none none solid solid; background: #e3e3e3"|Record
| align="center" style="border-style: none none solid solid; background: #e3e3e3"|Opponent
| align="center" style="border-style: none none solid solid; background: #e3e3e3"|Type
| align="center" style="border-style: none none solid solid; background: #e3e3e3"|Round
| align="center" style="border-style: none none solid solid; background: #e3e3e3"|Date
| align="center" style="border-style: none none solid solid; background: #e3e3e3"|Location
| align="center" style="border-style: none none solid solid; background: #e3e3e3"|Notes
|-align=center
|Loss
|178–20–2 
|align=left| Damon Reed
|RTD
|1
|10/04/2009
|align=left| Landon Arena, Topeka, Kansas
|align=left|
|-
|Loss
|178–19–2 
|align=left| Marcus Oliveira
|TKO
|2
|30/06/2007
|align=left| Ramada Inn, Topeka, Kansas
|align=left|
|-
|Loss
|178–18–2 
|align=left| Rob Calloway
|TKO
|3
|24/02/2007
|align=left| St. Joseph Civic Arena, Saint Joseph, Missouri
|align=left|
|-
|Loss
|178–17–2 
|align=left| Julius Fogle
|UD
|6
|26/08/2006
|align=left| Beaumont Club, Kansas City, Missouri
|align=left|
|-
|Loss
|178–16–2 
|align=left| Jorge Kahwagi
|KO
|1
|31/05/2003
|align=left| Auditorio Fausto Gutierrez Moreno, Tijuana
|align=left|
|-
|No Contest
|178–15–2 
|align=left| Dwayne Swift
|ND
|8
|05/12/2000
|align=left| Central Plaza Hotel, Oklahoma City, Oklahoma
|align=left|
|-
|Loss
|178–15–2 
|align=left| Quirino Garcia
|TKO
|7
|02/09/2000
|align=left| Don Haskins Center, El Paso, Texas
|align=left|
|-
|style="background:#ddd;"|No Contest
|178–14–2 
|align=left| Rob Bleakley
|ND
|6
|11/05/2000
|align=left| Capitol Plaza Hotel, Jefferson City, Missouri
|align=left|
|-
|Loss
|178–14–2 
|align=left| Julio César Chávez
|TKO
|3
|18/12/1999
|align=left| Culiacán
|align=left|
|-
|Loss
|178–13–2 
|align=left| Antonio Margarito
|TKO
|5
|23/10/1999
|align=left| Will Rogers Coliseum, Fort Worth, Texas
|align=left|
|-
|style="background:#ddd;"|No Contest
|178–12–2 
|align=left| Danny Thomas
|ND
|6
|20/05/1999
|align=left| Argosy Casino, Kansas City, Missouri
|align=left|
|-
|style="background:#ddd;"|No Contest
|178–12–2 
|align=left| Ronnie Warrior, Jr.
|ND
|4
|10/10/1998
|align=left| St. Joseph Civic Arena, Saint Joseph, Missouri
|align=left|
|-
|Loss
|178–12–2 
|align=left| James Coker
|KO
|8
|01/05/1998
|align=left| Freeman Coliseum, San Antonio, Texas
|align=left|
|-
|style="background:#ddd;"|No Contest
|178–11–2 
|align=left| Verdell Smith
|ND
|6
|23/04/1998
|align=left| Adam's Mark, Tulsa, Oklahoma
|align=left|
|-
|style="background:#ddd;"|No Contest
|178–11–2 
|align=left| Verdell Smith
|ND
|6
|28/03/1998
|align=left| River Market, Kansas City, Missouri
|align=left|
|-
|Loss
|178–11–2 
|align=left| Jose "Shibata" Flores
|UD
|10
|15/03/1998
|align=left| El Cajon, California
|align=left|
|-
|style="background:#ddd;"|No Contest
|178–10–2 
|align=left| Manuel Esparza
|ND
|4
|10/02/1998
|align=left| St. Joseph Civic Arena, Saint Joseph, Missouri
|align=left|
|-
|Win
|178–10–2 
|align=left| Manuel Esparza
|UD
|4
|02/12/1997
|align=left| Memphis, Tennessee
|align=left|
|-
|style="background:#ddd;"|No Contest
|177–10–2 
|align=left| Verdell Smith
|ND
|6
|15/11/1997
|align=left| River Market, Kansas City, Missouri
|align=left|
|-
|Win
|177–10–2 
|align=left| Ken Manuel
|TKO
|4
|30/09/1997
|align=left| University Plaza Hotel, Louisville, Kentucky
|align=left|
|-
|No Contest
|176–10–2 
|align=left| Rob Bleakley
|ND
|8
|09/06/1997
|align=left| Supertoad, Lexington, Oklahoma
|align=left|
|-
|Win
|176–10–2 
|align=left| Keheven Johnson
|PTS
|4
|28/03/1997
|align=left| Blue Springs, Missouri
|align=left|
|-
|Win
|175–10–2 
|align=left| Richard W. Wilson
|MD
|6
|21/12/1996
|align=left| Beaumont Club, Kansas City, Missouri
|align=left|
|-
|Loss
|174–10–2 
|align=left| Mark Breland
|KO
|3
|19/05/1996
|align=left| The Palace of Auburn Hills, Auburn Hills, Michigan
|align=left|
|-
|Win
|174–9–2 
|align=left|Stan Williamson
|TKO
|3
|04/04/1996
|align=left| Wichita, Kansas
|align=left|
|-
|Win
|173–9–2 
|align=left|Jeff Frank
|UD
|10
|05/03/1996
|align=left| Memphis, Tennessee
|align=left|
|-
|Win
|172–9–2 
|align=left| Reggie Strickland
|PTS
|8
|19/12/1995
|align=left| Oklahoma City, Oklahoma
|align=left|
|-
|Win
|171–9–2 
|align=left| Terry Williams
|PTS
|8
|04/12/1995
|align=left| Lexington, Oklahoma
|align=left|
|-
|Loss
|170–9–2 
|align=left| Gary Murray
|UD
|12
|26/08/1995
|align=left| Village Green, Durban
|align=left|
|-
|Win
|170–8–2 
|align=left| Reggie Strickland
|PTS
|6
|03/08/1995
|align=left| Wichita, Kansas
|align=left|
|-
|Loss
|169–8–2 
|align=left| Shannan Taylor
|TD
|6
|29/05/1995
|align=left| Parramatta Stadium, Sydney
|align=left|
|-
|Win
|169–7–2 
|align=left| Anthony Davidson
|KO
|1
|11/05/1995
|align=left| Capitol Plaza Hotel, Jefferson City, Missouri
|align=left|
|-
|Win
|168–7–2 
|align=left| Rob Bleakley
|PTS
|8
|04/05/1995
|align=left| Wichita, Kansas
|align=left|
|-
|style="background:#ddd;"|No Contest
|167–7–2 
|align=left| James Osunsedo
|ND
|4
|25/04/1995
|align=left| Kentucky
|align=left|
|-
|style="background:#ddd;"|No Contest
|167–7–2 
|align=left| James Osunsedo
|ND
|6
|24/04/1995
|align=left| Kentucky
|align=left|
|-
|Win
|167–7–2 
|align=left| Bob Ervin
|UD
|6
|13/03/1995
|align=left| Wichita, Kansas
|align=left|
|-
|Win
|166–7–2 
|align=left| Reggie Strickland
|PTS
|6
|05/03/1995
|align=left| Civic Assembly Center, Muskogee, Oklahoma
|align=left|
|-
|Win
|165–7–2 
|align=left| Richard W. Wilson
|TKO
|3
|23/02/1995
|align=left| Lexington, Oklahoma
|align=left|
|-
|Win
|164–7–2 
|align=left| Tommy Jeans
|TKO
|3
|16/02/1995
|align=left| University Club, Kansas City, Missouri
|align=left|
|-
|style="background:#ddd;"|No Contest
|163–7–2 
|align=left| Verdell Smith
|ND
|6
|07/02/1995
|align=left| Grand Island, Nebraska
|align=left|
|-
|Loss
|163–7–2 
|align=left| Buddy McGirt
|UD
|10
|10/01/1995
|align=left| Pontchartrain Center, Kenner, Louisiana
|align=left|
|-
|Win
|163–6–2 
|align=left| Kenny Willis
|PTS
|6
|13/12/1994
|align=left| Kentucky
|align=left|
|-
|Win
|162–6–2 
|align=left| Stanley Jones
|TKO
|6
|18/11/1994
|align=left| Expo Square Pavilion, Tulsa, Oklahoma
|align=left|
|-
|Win
|161–6–2 
|align=left| Reggie Strickland
|UD
|6
|03/11/1994
|align=left| Capitol Plaza Hotel, Jefferson City, Missouri
|align=left|
|-
|Win
|160–6–2 
|align=left| Terry Williams
|PTS
|8
|10/10/1994
|align=left| Grand Island, Nebraska
|align=left|
|-
|Win
|159–6–2 
|align=left| Reggie Strickland
|PTS
|6
|17/09/1994
|align=left| Lexington, Oklahoma
|align=left|
|-
|Win
|158–6–2 
|align=left| Billy Pryor
|TKO
|5
|10/09/1994
|align=left| Wichita, Kansas
|align=left|
|-
|Win
|157–6–2 
|align=left| Bob Ervin
|TKO
|4
|16/08/1994
|align=left| Grand Island, Nebraska
|align=left|
|-
|Loss
|156–6–2 
|align=left| Cassius Clay Horne
|PTS
|8
|15/07/1994
|align=left| America West Arena, Phoenix, Arizona
|align=left|
|-
|No Contest
|156–5–2 
|align=left| Mark Brannon
|ND
|6
|11/06/1994
|align=left| Lexington, Oklahoma
|align=left|
|-
|No Contest
|156–5–2 
|align=left| Anthony Davidson
|ND
|3
|24/05/1994
|align=left| Louisville, Kentucky
|align=left|
|-
|Win
|156–5–2 
|align=left| Terry Williams
|PTS
|8
|30/04/1994
|align=left| Wichita, Kansas
|align=left|
|-
|style="background:#ddd;"|No Contest
|155–5–2 
|align=left| Mark Brannon
|ND
|4
|28/04/1994
|align=left| Springfield, Missouri
|align=left|
|-
|Win
|155–5–2 
|align=left| Tom Bowles
|TKO
|7
|12/04/1994
|align=left| Kansas City, Missouri
|align=left|
|-
|style="background:#ddd;"|No Contest
|154–5–2 
|align=left| Rob Bleakley
|ND
|8
|02/04/1994
|align=left| Lexington, Oklahoma
|align=left|
|-
|Win
|154–5–2 
|align=left| Rob Bleakley
|PTS
|8
|30/03/1994
|align=left| Wichita, Kansas
|align=left|
|-
|Win
|153–5–2 
|align=left|Jeff Frank
|PTS
|6
|04/01/1994
|align=left| Memphis, Tennessee
|align=left|
|-
|Win
|152–5–2 
|align=left| Anthony Davidson
|PTS
|6
|09/12/1993
|align=left| Wichita, Kansas
|align=left|
|-
|Win
|151–5–2 
|align=left| Anthony Montana
|KO
|5
|07/12/1993
|align=left| Memphis, Tennessee
|align=left|
|-
|Win
|150–5–2 
|align=left| Anthony Davidson
|PTS
|6
|23/11/1993
|align=left| Kansas City, Missouri
|align=left|
|-
|Win
|149–5–2 
|align=left| Kelly Brown
|KO
|2
|15/11/1993
|align=left| Lexington, Oklahoma
|align=left|
|-
|Win
|148–5–2 
|align=left| Steve Barton
|TKO
|3
|02/11/1993
|align=left| Oklahoma City, Oklahoma
|align=left|
|-
|Win
|147–5–2 
|align=left| George Jackson
|KO
|3
|27/10/1993
|align=left| Wichita, Kansas
|align=left|
|-
|Win
|146–5–2 
|align=left| Cornell Butts
|KO
|3
|19/10/1993
|align=left| Oklahoma City, Oklahoma
|align=left|
|-
|Win
|145–5–2 
|align=left| Anthony Henry
|KO
|1
|29/09/1993
|align=left| Brady Theater, Tulsa, Oklahoma
|align=left|
|-
|Loss
|144–5–2 
|align=left| Brandon Croly
|PTS
|8
|19/08/1993
|align=left| Missouri State Fair, Sedalia, Missouri
|align=left|
|-
|Win
|144–4–2 
|align=left| Terry Williams
|PTS
|8
|04/08/1993
|align=left| Lexington, Oklahoma
|align=left|
|-
|style="background:#ddd;"|No Contest
|143–4–2 
|align=left| Heath Todd
|ND
|6
|24/07/1993
|align=left| Joplin, Missouri
|align=left|
|-
|Win
|143–4–2 
|align=left|Willie Jackson
|KO
|2
|16/06/1993
|align=left| Marriott Downtown, Wichita, Kansas
|align=left|
|-
|Loss
|142–4–2 
|align=left| Brandon Croly
|MD
|10
|01/05/1993
|align=left| Del Mar, California
|align=left|
|-
|Win
|142–3–2 
|align=left| George Jackson
|TKO
|1
|19/04/1993
|align=left| Saint Louis, Missouri
|align=left|
|-
|Win
|141–3–2 
|align=left| Kenneth Kidd
|TKO
|1
|30/03/1993
|align=left| Kemper Arena, Kansas City, Missouri
|align=left|
|-
|Win
|140–3–2 
|align=left|Chris Clark
|TKO
|3
|27/03/1993
|align=left| Lexington, Oklahoma
|align=left|
|-
|Win
|139–3–2 
|align=left|Tony Miller
|TKO
|1
|26/03/1993
|align=left| Oklahoma City, Oklahoma
|align=left|
|-
|Win
|138–3–2 
|align=left| Gary Brown
|PTS
|6
|24/03/1993
|align=left| Louisville, Kentucky
|align=left|
|-
|Win
|137–3–2 
|align=left| Tim Bonds
|TKO
|5
|23/03/1993
|align=left| Evansville, Indiana
|align=left|
|-
|Win
|136–3–2 
|align=left| Keith Jones
|TKO
|5
|19/03/1993
|align=left| Wichita, Kansas
|align=left|
|-
|Win
|135–3–2 
|align=left| Tom Bowles
|KO
|5
|15/03/1993
|align=left| Jefferson City, Missouri
|align=left|
|-
|Win
|134–3–2 
|align=left|Jeff Frank
|TKO
|3
|09/03/1993
|align=left| Nashville, Tennessee
|align=left|
|-
|Win
|133–3–2 
|align=left| Anthony Montana
|TKO
|2
|06/03/1993
|align=left| Oklahoma City, Oklahoma
|align=left|
|-
|Win
|132–3–2 
|align=left| John Ramirez
|TKO
|2
|05/03/1993
|align=left| Louisville, Kentucky
|align=left|
|-
|Win
|131–3–2 
|align=left| Gary Brown
|UD
|6
|03/03/1993
|align=left| Louisville, Kentucky
|align=left|
|-
|Win
|130–3–2 
|align=left|Tom Rhinehart
|PTS
|6
|01/03/1993
|align=left| Allis Plaza Hotel, Kansas City, Missouri
|align=left|
|-
|Win
|129–3–2 
|align=left| Felix Dubray
|PTS
|12
|23/02/1993
|align=left| Purcell, Oklahoma
|align=left|
|-
|Win
|128–3–2 
|align=left| Dean Keene
|TKO
|2
|14/02/1993
|align=left| Great Falls, Montana
|align=left|
|-
|Win
|127–3–2 
|align=left| Tim Brooks
|PTS
|6
|06/02/1993
|align=left| Greensburg, Indiana
|align=left|
|-
|Win
|126–3–2 
|align=left| Kenny Willis
|PTS
|6
|03/02/1993
|align=left| London, Kentucky
|align=left|
|-
|style="background:#ddd;"|No Contest
|125–3–2 
|align=left| Tony R. Kern
|ND
|4
|02/02/1993
|align=left| Indianapolis, Indiana
|align=left|
|-
|style="background:#ddd;"|No Contest
|125–3–2 
|align=left| Keith Jones
|NC
|3
|25/01/1993
|align=left| Allis Plaza Hotel, Kansas City, Missouri
|align=left|
|-
|Win
|125–3–2 
|align=left| Bob Ervin
|TKO
|3
|23/01/1993
|align=left| Veteran's Coliseum, Cedar Rapids, Iowa
|align=left|
|-
|Win
|124–3–2 
|align=left| Howard Stern
|PTS
|8
|09/01/1993
|align=left| Oklahoma City, Oklahoma
|align=left|
|-
|Win
|123–3–2 
|align=left| Anthony Davidson
|TKO
|2
|02/01/1993
|align=left| Mid America All Indian Center, Wichita, Kansas
|align=left|
|-
|Loss
|122–3–2 
|align=left| Kevin Pompey
|UD
|12
|18/11/1992
|align=left| Knickerbacker Arena, Troy, New York
|align=left|
|-
|style="background:#ddd;"|No Contest
|122–2–2 
|align=left| Harold Brazier
|ND
|6
|07/11/1992
|align=left| Murray, Kentucky
|align=left|
|-
|Win
|122–2–2 
|align=left| Ivan Guban
|PTS
|8
|21/10/1992
|align=left| Oklahoma City, Oklahoma
|align=left|
|-
|Win
|121–2–2 
|align=left| Eugene George
|TKO
|3
|17/10/1992
|align=left| Des Moines, Iowa
|align=left|
|-
|Win
|120–2–2 
|align=left| Shane Davis
|KO
|2
|05/10/1992
|align=left| Allis Plaza Hotel, Kansas City, Missouri
|align=left|
|-
|Win
|119–2–2 
|align=left| Wilbert Blaine
|KO
|1
|02/10/1992
|align=left| Oklahoma City, Oklahoma
|align=left|
|-
|Win
|118–2–2 
|align=left| Tony Enna
|TKO
|4
|24/09/1992
|align=left| Wichita, Kansas
|align=left|
|-
|Win
|117–2–2 
|align=left|Rick Jones
|KO
|4
|15/09/1992
|align=left| Oklahoma City, Oklahoma
|align=left|
|-
|Win
|116–2–2 
|align=left| Bob Ervin
|PTS
|6
|29/08/1992
|align=left| Oklahoma City, Oklahoma
|align=left|
|-
|Win
|115–2–2 
|align=left| Keheven Johnson
|KO
|5
|26/08/1992
|align=left| Pueblo, Colorado
|align=left|
|-
|style="background:#ddd;"|No Contest
|114–2–2 
|align=left| Kenneth Kidd
|ND
|6
|17/08/1992
|align=left| Allis Plaza Hotel, Kansas City, Missouri
|align=left|
|-
|Win
|114–2–2 
|align=left| Anthony Montana
|KO
|5
|01/08/1992
|align=left| Denver, Colorado
|align=left|
|-
|Win
|113–2–2 
|align=left|Bob Peru
|TKO
|4
|25/07/1992
|align=left| Hugo, Oklahoma
|align=left|
|-
|style="background:#ddd;"|No Contest
|112–2–2 
|align=left| Harold Brazier
|ND
|6
|23/07/1992
|align=left| Oklahoma City, Oklahoma
|align=left|
|-
|Win
|112–2–2 
|align=left| Sam Wilson
|TKO
|2
|27/06/1992
|align=left| Paducah, Kentucky
|align=left|
|-
|Win
|111–2–2 
|align=left| Jeff Charles
|PTS
|6
|22/06/1992
|align=left| Bridgeton, Missouri
|align=left|
|-
|Win
|110–2–2 
|align=left| Tommy Degen
|KO
|4
|20/06/1992
|align=left| KIKS Soccer Arena, Wichita, Kansas
|align=left|
|-
|Win
|109–2–2 
|align=left| Ray Harris
|PTS
|6
|02/06/1992
|align=left| Memphis, Tennessee
|align=left|
|-
|Win
|108–2–2 
|align=left|Rodney Johnson
|UD
|6
|19/05/1992
|align=left| Central Plaza Hotel, Oklahoma City, Oklahoma
|align=left|
|-
|Win
|107–2–2 
|align=left|Marco Davis
|TKO
|2
|19/05/1992
|align=left| Wichita, Kansas
|align=left|
|-
|Win
|106–2–2 
|align=left| William Hernandez
|KO
|2
|07/05/1992
|align=left| Lexington, Oklahoma
|align=left|
|-
|Win
|105–2–2 
|align=left| Tim Bonds
|TKO
|3
|28/04/1992
|align=left| Indianapolis, Indiana
|align=left|
|-
|Win
|104–2–2 
|align=left| Jesse Martinez
|TKO
|3
|16/04/1992
|align=left| Oklahoma City, Oklahoma
|align=left|
|-
|Win
|103–2–2 
|align=left| Billy Turner
|TKO
|3
|28/03/1992
|align=left| Bartlesville, Oklahoma
|align=left|
|-
|Win
|102–2–2 
|align=left| Jorge Acosta
|PTS
|6
|24/03/1992
|align=left| Indianapolis, Indiana
|align=left|
|-
|Win
|101–2–2 
|align=left| Sammy Brooks
|TKO
|6
|23/03/1992
|align=left| Allis Plaza Hotel, Kansas City, Missouri
|align=left|
|-
|Win
|100–2–2 
|align=left|Charlie Coldwater
|TKO
|3
|14/03/1992
|align=left| Mid America All Indian Center, Wichita, Kansas
|align=left|
|-
|Win
|99–2–2 
|align=left| Quinton Fox
|TKO
|4
|12/03/1992
|align=left| Oklahoma City, Oklahoma
|align=left|
|-
|Win
|98–2–2 
|align=left| Darrell Miller
|KO
|5
|07/03/1992
|align=left| Veteran's Coliseum, Cedar Rapids, Iowa
|align=left|
|-
|Win
|97–2–2 
|align=left| Kenneth Kidd
|TKO
|2
|08/02/1992
|align=left| Lexington, Oklahoma
|align=left|
|-
|Win
|96–2–2 
|align=left| Dennis Dickerson
|PTS
|8
|03/02/1992
|align=left| Kansas City, Missouri
|align=left|
|-
|Win
|95–2–2 
|align=left| Brian Young
|TKO
|5
|01/02/1992
|align=left| Greensburg, Indiana
|align=left|
|-
|Win
|94–2–2 
|align=left| Wilbert Blaine
|KO
|1
|30/01/1992
|align=left| Central Plaza Hotel, Oklahoma City, Oklahoma
|align=left|
|-
|Win
|93–2–2 
|align=left| Tim Bonds
|TKO
|4
|24/01/1992
|align=left| Mid America All Indian Center, Wichita, Kansas
|align=left|
|-
|Win
|92–2–2 
|align=left| Lorenzo Thomas
|KO
|3
|11/01/1992
|align=left| Lexington, Oklahoma
|align=left|
|-
|Win
|91–2–2 
|align=left| Robert Wangila
|TKO
|2
|19/12/1991
|align=left| The Hacienda, Las Vegas, Nevada
|align=left|
|-
|Win
|90–2–2 
|align=left| Jerry Brown
|TKO
|5
|03/12/1991
|align=left| Oklahoma City, Oklahoma
|align=left|
|-
|Win
|89–2–2 
|align=left| Dick Allen
|TKO
|3
|19/11/1991
|align=left| Oklahoma City, Oklahoma
|align=left|
|-
|Win
|88–2–2 
|align=left| George Randolph
|TKO
|3
|14/11/1991
|align=left| Bozeman, Montana
|align=left|
|-
|Win
|87–2–2 
|align=left| Tim Payton
|PTS
|6
|17/10/1991
|align=left| Indianapolis, Indiana
|align=left|
|-
|Win
|86–2–2 
|align=left| Quinton Fox
|PTS
|6
|14/10/1991
|align=left| Wichita, Kansas
|align=left|
|-
|Win
|85–2–2 
|align=left| Rico Hernandez
|TKO
|5
|12/10/1991
|align=left| Lincoln, Nebraska
|align=left|
|-
|Win
|84–2–2 
|align=left| Keheven Johnson
|KO
|3
|01/10/1991
|align=left| Memphis, Tennessee
|align=left|
|-
|Win
|83–2–2 
|align=left| Howard Stern
|KO
|2
|11/09/1991
|align=left| Central Plaza Hotel, Oklahoma City, Oklahoma
|align=left|
|-
|Win
|82–2–2 
|align=left| Kenneth Kidd
|PTS
|6
|09/09/1991
|align=left| Kansas City, Missouri
|align=left|
|-
|Win
|81–2–2 
|align=left| Keheven Johnson
|TKO
|5
|08/08/1991
|align=left| Joey's Blues Bar, Tulsa, Oklahoma
|align=left|
|-
|Win
|80–2–2 
|align=left| Harold Pinckney
|KO
|2
|06/08/1991
|align=left| Memphis, Tennessee
|align=left|
|-
|Win
|79–2–2 
|align=left| Mike Crawford
|KO
|1
|09/07/1991
|align=left| Central Plaza Hotel, Oklahoma City, Oklahoma
|align=left|
|-
|Win
|78–2–2 
|align=left| Trent Elwick
|PTS
|6
|17/06/1991
|align=left| Oklahoma City, Oklahoma
|align=left|
|-
|Win
|77–2–2 
|align=left| Rocky Berg
|PTS
|6
|30/05/1991
|align=left| West Memphis, Arkansas
|align=left|
|-
|Win
|76–2–2 
|align=left| Jorge Acosta
|PTS
|10
|24/05/1991
|align=left| Carthage, Missouri
|align=left|
|-
|Win
|75–2–2 
|align=left|Vince Baldwin
|TKO
|1
|23/05/1991
|align=left| Omaha, Nebraska
|align=left|
|-
|Win
|74–2–2 
|align=left| Tommy Jeans
|KO
|2
|03/05/1991
|align=left| Boxing Plaza, Oklahoma City, Oklahoma
|align=left|
|-
|Win
|73–2–2 
|align=left| Jorge Acosta
|PTS
|10
|26/04/1991
|align=left| Wichita, Kansas
|align=left|
|-
|Win
|72–2–2 
|align=left| Darrell Bryant
|KO
|3
|13/04/1991
|align=left| Miami, Oklahoma
|align=left|
|-
|Win
|71–2–2 
|align=left|Ken Jackson
|KO
|2
|12/04/1991
|align=left| Muskogee, Oklahoma
|align=left|
|-
|Win
|70–2–2 
|align=left| Ira Hathaway
|KO
|4
|05/04/1991
|align=left| Boxing Plaza, Oklahoma City, Oklahoma
|align=left|
|-
|Win
|69–2–2 
|align=left| Rico Hernandez
|UD
|8
|14/03/1991
|align=left| Park Plaza Hotel, Tulsa, Oklahoma
|align=left|
|-
|Win
|68–2–2 
|align=left| Tommy Degen
|KO
|3
|08/03/1991
|align=left| Crest Theatre, Wichita, Kansas
|align=left|
|-
|Win
|67–2–2 
|align=left| Bobby Thomas
|KO
|2
|01/03/1991
|align=left| Oklahoma City, Oklahoma
|align=left|
|-
|Win
|66–2–2 
|align=left| Mike Mackey
|KO
|2
|23/02/1991
|align=left| Ardmore, Oklahoma
|align=left|
|-
|Win
|65–2–2 
|align=left| Jarvis McMillan
|TKO
|2
|19/02/1991
|align=left| T. Michael's Dance Club, Goodlettsville, Tennessee
|align=left|
|-
|Win
|64–2–2 
|align=left| Andre Hawthorne
|KO
|3
|16/02/1991
|align=left| Oklahoma City, Oklahoma
|align=left|
|-
|Win
|63–2–2 
|align=left| Jake Torrance
|PTS
|10
|01/02/1991
|align=left| Oklahoma City, Oklahoma
|align=left|
|-
|Win
|62–2–2 
|align=left| Jerry L. Smith
|KO
|2
|22/01/1991
|align=left| Park Plaza Hotel, Tulsa, Oklahoma
|align=left|
|-
|Win
|61–2–2 
|align=left| Kevin Anderson
|TKO
|1
|06/01/1991
|align=left| Bismarck Civic Center, Bismarck, North Dakota
|align=left|
|-
|style="background:#ddd;"|No Contest
|60–2–2 
|align=left| Kenneth Kidd
|ND
|4
|11/12/1990
|align=left| Sherwood Club, Indianapolis, Indiana
|align=left|
|-
|Win
|60–2–2 
|align=left| John E.D. Simmons
|KO
|3
|04/12/1990
|align=left| Central Plaza Hotel, Oklahoma City, Oklahoma
|align=left|
|-
|Win
|59–2–2 
|align=left| Willie Barnes
|KO
|6
|17/11/1990
|align=left| Sheraton Kensington Hotel, Tulsa, Oklahoma
|align=left|
|-
|Win
|58–2–2 
|align=left| John Greene
|KO
|1
|08/11/1990
|align=left| Lexington, Oklahoma
|align=left|
|-
|Win
|57–2–2 
|align=left| Tommy Jeans
|PTS
|6
|06/11/1990
|align=left| Omni New Daisy Theatre, Memphis, Tennessee
|align=left|
|-
|Win
|56–2–2 
|align=left| Keheven Johnson
|UD
|6
|01/11/1990
|align=left| Sherwood Club, Indianapolis, Indiana
|align=left|
|-
|Win
|55–2–2 
|align=left| Ali Akar
|PTS
|8
|27/10/1990
|align=left| Bismarck Civic Center, Bismarck, North Dakota
|align=left|
|-
|Win
|54–2–2 
|align=left|Elwee Jackson
|KO
|4
|23/10/1990
|align=left| Lexington, Oklahoma
|align=left|
|-
|Win
|53–2–2 
|align=left| Billy Tutt
|KO
|1
|19/10/1990
|align=left| Central Plaza Hotel, Oklahoma City, Oklahoma
|align=left|
|-
|Win
|52–2–2 
|align=left| Sam Wilson
|TKO
|4
|13/10/1990
|align=left| Louisville, Kentucky
|align=left|
|-
|Win
|51–2–2 
|align=left| Kenny Brown
|PTS
|12
|27/09/1991
|align=left| Oklahoma City, Oklahoma
|align=left|
|-
|Win
|50–2–2 
|align=left| Tim Jackson
|KO
|2
|11/09/1990
|align=left| Oklahoma City, Oklahoma
|align=left|
|-
|style="background:#ddd;"|No Contest
|49–2–2 
|align=left| Harold Brazier
|ND
|15
|27/08/1990
|align=left| Park Plaza Hotel, Tulsa, Oklahoma
|align=left|
|-
|Win
|49–2–2 
|align=left| Marcellus Jackson
|TKO
|3
|07/08/1990
|align=left| Memphis, Tennessee
|align=left|
|-
|Win
|48–2–2 
|align=left| Bobby Thomas
|KO
|1
|31/07/1990
|align=left| Oklahoma City, Oklahoma
|align=left|
|-
|Win
|47–2–2 
|align=left| John Greene
|TKO
|4
|30/07/1990
|align=left| Oklahoma City, Oklahoma
|align=left|
|-
|Win
|46–2–2 
|align=left| Reese Smith
|KO
|1
|16/07/1990
|align=left| Oklahoma City, Oklahoma
|align=left|
|-
|Win
|45–2–2 
|align=left| Willie Barnes
|KO
|9
|21/06/1990
|align=left| Oklahoma City, Oklahoma
|align=left|
|-
|Win
|44–2–2 
|align=left| Leroy Jones
|UD
|6
|09/06/1990
|align=left| Kansas City Memorial Hall, Kansas City, Kansas
|align=left|
|-
|Win
|43–2–2 
|align=left| Anthony Phillips
|KO
|5
|24/05/1990
|align=left| Oklahoma City, Oklahoma
|align=left|
|-
|Win
|42–2–2 
|align=left| Bud Adams
|KO
|1
|18/05/1990
|align=left| Norman, Oklahoma
|align=left|
|-
|Win
|41–2–2 
|align=left|John Walker
|KO
|3
|01/05/1990
|align=left| Oklahoma City, Oklahoma
|align=left|
|-
|Win
|40–2–2 
|align=left| Bobby Thomas
|KO
|4
|17/04/1990
|align=left| Oklahoma City, Oklahoma
|align=left|
|-
|Win
|39–2–2 
|align=left| Ricky Decker
|KO
|3
|03/04/1990
|align=left| Oklahoma City, Oklahoma
|align=left|
|-
|Win
|38–2–2 
|align=left| Tim Brooks
|KO
|6
|20/03/1990
|align=left| Oklahoma City, Oklahoma
|align=left|
|-
|Win
|37–2–2 
|align=left| Ali Akar
|KO
|1
|06/03/1990
|align=left| Oklahoma City, Oklahoma
|align=left|
|-
|Win
|36–2–2 
|align=left| Rico Hernandez
|KO
|5
|20/02/1990
|align=left| Central Plaza Hotel, Oklahoma City, Oklahoma
|align=left|
|-
|Win
|35–2–2 
|align=left| Rocky Berg
|PTS
|10
|23/01/1990
|align=left| Oklahoma City, Oklahoma
|align=left|
|-
|Win
|34–2–2 
|align=left| Kirkland Laing
|KO
|7
|10/01/1990
|align=left| Royal Albert Hall, London
|align=left|
|-
|Win
|33–2–2 
|align=left| Gary Thompson
|PTS
|10
|12/12/1989
|align=left| Oklahoma City, Oklahoma
|align=left|
|-
|Win
|32–2–2 
|align=left| Mike Gregory
|KO
|1
|05/12/1989
|align=left| Oklahoma City, Oklahoma
|align=left|
|-
|Win
|31–2–2 
|align=left| Tim Jackson
|KO
|3
|29/11/1989
|align=left| Norman, Oklahoma
|align=left|
|-
|style="background:#ddd;"|No Contest
|30–2–2 
|align=left| Terry Lee Thomas
|ND
|10
|21/11/1989
|align=left| Oklahoma City, Oklahoma
|align=left|
|-
|Win
|30–2–2
|align=left| Rico Hernandez
|UD
|8
|07/11/1989
|align=left| Central Plaza Hotel, Oklahoma City, Oklahoma
|align=left|
|-
|Win
|29–2–2
|align=left| Jesse Martinez
|KO
|3
|17/10/1989
|align=left| Central Plaza Hotel, Oklahoma City, Oklahoma
|align=left|
|-
|Win
|28–2–2
|align=left| James Solomon
|KO
|2
|03/10/1989
|align=left| Oklahoma City, Oklahoma
|align=left|
|-
|Win
|27–2–2
|align=left| Gary Thompson
|PTS
|8
|05/09/1989
|align=left| Oklahoma City, Oklahoma
|align=left|
|-
|Win
|26–2–2
|align=left|Randy Collins
|KO
|4
|24/08/1989
|align=left| Oklahoma City, Oklahoma
|align=left|
|-
|Win
|25–2–2
|align=left| Jerry Williamson
|PTS
|6
|15/08/1989
|align=left| Oklahoma City, Oklahoma
|align=left|
|-
|Win
|24–2–2
|align=left| Ponce Ortiz
|KO
|3
|01/08/1989
|align=left| Oklahoma City, Oklahoma
|align=left|
|-
|Win
|23–2–2
|align=left| Dick Allen
|KO
|2
|11/07/1989
|align=left| Oklahoma City, Oklahoma
|align=left|
|-
|Loss
|22–2–2
|align=left| Robert Wangila
|MD
|6
|12/06/1989
|align=left| Caesars Palace, Las Vegas, Nevada
|align=left|
|-
|Draw
|22–1–2
|align=left| Tim Bennett
|TD
|1
|02/05/1989
|align=left| Oklahoma City, Oklahoma
|align=left|
|-
|Win
|22–1–1
|align=left| Brad Billings
|KO
|3
|15/04/1989
|align=left| Oklahoma City, Oklahoma
|align=left|
|-
|Win
|21–1–1
|align=left| Tim Brooks
|PTS
|6
|04/04/1989
|align=left| Oklahoma City, Oklahoma
|align=left|
|-
|Win
|20–1–1
|align=left| Wilson Douglas
|KO
|2
|21/03/1989
|align=left| Oklahoma City, Oklahoma
|align=left|
|-
|Win
|19–1–1
|align=left| Billy Tutt
|KO
|3
|07/03/1989
|align=left| Central Plaza Hotel, Oklahoma City, Oklahoma
|align=left|
|-
|Win
|18–1–1
|align=left| Keheven Johnson
|PTS
|4
|21/02/1989
|align=left| Oklahoma City, Oklahoma
|align=left|
|-
|Win
|17–1–1
|align=left| Jim Wright
|KO
|2
|07/02/1989
|align=left| Central Plaza Hotel, Oklahoma City, Oklahoma
|align=left|
|-
|Win
|16–1–1
|align=left| Jose Ramirez
|KO
|4
|06/12/1988
|align=left| Oklahoma City, Oklahoma
|align=left|
|-
|Win
|15–1–1
|align=left| Trent Elwick
|KO
|3
|15/11/1988
|align=left| Oklahoma City, Oklahoma
|align=left|
|-
|Win
|14–1–1
|align=left| Tim Hall
|TKO
|2
|01/11/1988
|align=left| Central Plaza Hotel, Oklahoma City, Oklahoma
|align=left|
|-
|Win
|13–1–1
|align=left| Jerry Brown
|KO
|3
|18/10/1988
|align=left| Central Plaza Hotel, Oklahoma City, Oklahoma
|align=left|
|-
|Win
|12–1–1
|align=left| Mike Armstrong
|KO
|2
|04/10/1988
|align=left| Central Plaza Hotel, Oklahoma City, Oklahoma
|align=left|
|-
|Win
|11–1–1
|align=left| Richie White
|PTS
|4
|20/09/1988
|align=left| Central Plaza Hotel, Oklahoma City, Oklahoma
|align=left|
|-
|Win
|10–1–1
|align=left| Carl Penn
|KO
|2
|30/08/1988
|align=left| Habana Inn, Oklahoma City, Oklahoma
|align=left|
|-
|Win
|9–1–1
|align=left| Roger Choate
|PTS
|6
|02/08/1988
|align=left| Central Plaza Hotel, Oklahoma City, Oklahoma
|align=left|
|-
|Win
|8–1–1
|align=left| Tim Bonds
|KO
|2
|19/07/1988
|align=left| Oklahoma City, Oklahoma
|align=left|
|-
|Draw
|7–1–1
|align=left|Wendell Stafford
|PTS
|4
|05/07/1988
|align=left| Central Plaza Hotel, Oklahoma City, Oklahoma
|align=left|
|-
|Win
|7–1
|align=left| Nicholas Gray
|KO
|2
|05/04/1988
|align=left| Central Plaza Hotel, Oklahoma City, Oklahoma
|align=left|
|-
|Win
|6–1
|align=left| Clarence King
|KO
|1
|01/03/1988
|align=left| Oklahoma City, Oklahoma
|align=left|
|-
|Win
|5–1
|align=left| Vernon Garrett
|UD
|4
|02/02/1988
|align=left| Central Plaza Hotel, Oklahoma City, Oklahoma
|align=left|
|-
|Win
|4–1
|align=left| Simmie Black
|UD
|6
|17/11/1987
|align=left| Central Plaza Hotel, Oklahoma City, Oklahoma
|align=left|
|-
|Win
|3–1
|align=left| Steve McMinn
|KO
|2
|28/10/1987
|align=left| Dallas, Texas
|align=left|
|-
|Win
|2–1
|align=left| Tim Jackson
|KO
|1
|20/10/1987
|align=left| Central Plaza Hotel, Oklahoma City, Oklahoma
|align=left|
|-
|Win
|1–1
|align=left| Mike Gregory
|KO
|1
|06/10/1987
|align=left| Central Plaza Hotel, Oklahoma City, Oklahoma
|align=left|
|-
|Loss
|0–1
|align=left| Ali Smith
|PTS
|4
|18/08/1987
|align=left| Trade Winds Central Inn, Oklahoma City, Oklahoma
|align=left|
|}

See also
Angel Robinson Garcia
Peter Buckley

References

External links

1965 births
Boxers from Oklahoma
Welterweight boxers
Living people
Sportspeople from Oklahoma City
American male boxers
African-American boxers